The Shadow , also known as The Circus Shadow, is a 1937 American mystery film, directed by Charles C. Coleman for Columbia Pictures. It stars Rita Hayworth, Charles Quigley and Marc Lawrence.

Cast
 Rita Hayworth as Mary Gillespie
 Charles Quigley as Jim Quinn
 Marc Lawrence as Kid Crow
 Arthur Loft as Sheriff Jackson
 Dick Curtis as Carlos
 Vernon Dent as Dutch Schultz
 Marjorie Main as Hannah Gillespie
 Donald Kirke as Señor Martinet
 Dwight Frye as Vindecco
 Bess Flowers as Marianne
 Bill Irving as Mac
 Eddie Fetherston as Woody
 Sally St. Clair as Dolores
 Sue St. Clair as Rosa
 John Tyrrell as Mr. Moreno
 Beatrice Curtis as Mrs. Moreno
 Ann Doran as Miss Shaw

References

External links
The Shadow at the Internet Movie Database

1937 films
American mystery films
1937 mystery films
Films directed by Charles C. Coleman
American black-and-white films
Columbia Pictures films
1930s American films
1930s English-language films